Flicka i kasern is a 1955 Swedish drama film directed by Börje Larsson.

Cast
 Sonja Stjernquist as Eva Seman
 Egon Larsson as Staffan Torell
 Sten Gester as Allan Bergsten
 Åke Söderblom as Fredrik Berg
 Hjördis Petterson as Olga
 Mary Rapp as Beda
 Siv Ericks as Edith
 Torsten Lilliecrona as Corporal
 Carl-Gustaf Lindstedt as Police Commissioner
 Harry Ahlin as Ernst Jansson
 Ragnar Arvedson as Colonel
 Hans Strååt as Captain

References

External links
 

1955 films
1955 drama films
Swedish drama films
1950s Swedish-language films
Films directed by Börje Larsson
Swedish black-and-white films
1950s Swedish films